Ainslee's Magazine was an American literary periodical published from 1897 to December 1926. It was originally published as a humor magazine called The Yellow Kid, based on the popular comic strip character. It was renamed Ainslee's the following year.

The magazine's publishers were Howard, Ainslee & Co., a division of the Street & Smith publishing house in New York City.

Contributors
Among those who contributed essays, short stories, or poetry to Ainslee's:

Stephen Crane
Arthur Conan Doyle
Theodore Dreiser
Maud Hart Lovelace
Bret Harte
O. Henry
Anthony Hope
Jack London
Edna St. Vincent Millay
E. Phillips Oppenheim
Constance Lindsay Skinner
Albert Payson Terhune
Stanley J. Weyman
P. G. Wodehouse
I. A. R. Wylie
Frances Gaither

From 1920 to 1923 Dorothy Parker wrote the monthly drama reviews column, "In Broadway Playhouses". Edith Isaacs worked as a critic for the magazine prior to her tenure at Theatre Arts.

Ainslee's lasted until December 1926, after which it was merged into Far West Illustrated.

References

External links

Gallery of Covers

Defunct literary magazines published in the United States
Defunct women's magazines published in the United States
Magazines established in 1897
Magazines disestablished in 1926
Magazines published in New York City
Street & Smith
Monthly magazines published in the United States